Centrocerum hirsuticeps is a species of beetle in the family Cerambycidae. It was described by Bosq in 1952.

References

Elaphidiini
Beetles described in 1952